Tadg mac Cathail (died 956) was King of Connacht.

References

 Leabhar na nGenealach, Dublin, 2004–2005
 Annals of the Four Masters, ed. John O'Donovan, Dublin, 1856
 Annals of Lough Ce, ed. W.M. Hennessey, London, 1871.
 Irish Kings and High Kings, Francis John Byrne, 3rd revised edition, Dublin: Four Courts Press, 2001. 
 "Ua Ruairc", in Seán Duffy (ed.), Medieval Ireland: An Encyclopedia. Routledge. 2005. pp.

956 deaths
People from County Roscommon
O'Conor dynasty
10th-century kings of Connacht
Year of birth unknown